Julian Ogilvie Thompson (born 1934 in Cape Town, South Africa) is a South African businessman and former chairman of De Beers and the Anglo American mining company.

Early life
Julian Ogilvie Thompson was born in 1934 in Cape Town, South Africa. His father, Newton Ogilvie Thompson, was a judge of Supreme Court of Appeal of South Africa.

Ogilvie Thompson was educated at Diocesan College in Cape Town and the University of Oxford.

Career
Ogilvie Thompson became personal assistant to Harry Oppenheimer in 1957, and he joined the Anglo American finance division in 1961. He went on to manage and head this division and also joined the De Beers board in 1966.

Ogilvie Thompson was appointed as an executive director of Anglo American in 1971 and as a vice chairman of Barclays National Bank, former First National Bank, in 1977. He succeeded Harry Oppenheimer as chairman of Minorco in 1982 and as chairman of De Beers in 1985. He succeeded Gavin Relly as chairman of Anglo American in 1990 and retired as chairman of De Beers in 1997 to become non-executive deputy chairman. After leading the 1999 merger of Anglo American and Minorco, Ogilvie Thompson became its chairman and CEO. He was succeeded by Tony Trahar in 2000 but continued as non-executive chairman. He resigned as deputy chairman of De Beers in 2002, but continued to be a non-executive director.

Ogilvie Thompson is a member of the Board of Trustees of the Mandela Rhodes Foundation.

Personal life
Ogilvie Thompson married The Honourable Tessa Mary Brand, daughter of Thomas Brand, 3rd Viscount Hampden, in 1956. She died in 2020.

References

External links
Profiles of Anglo American chief executives
Mandela Rhodes Foundation

1934 births
Alumni of Diocesan College, Cape Town
Living people
South African Rhodes Scholars
South African businesspeople
Alumni of Worcester College, Oxford